Gumbuya World (formerly Gumbuya Park) is an amusement park in Tynong North in Victoria, Australia. The park is owned by Jayco Australia founder and owner Gerry Ryan and Carsales owner Wal Pisciotta since September 2016.

The park contains various rides and attractions ranging from water slides to roller coasters and wildlife exhibits. Its two major waterslides are the Boomerango and the Taipan. The park also features a lazy river ride, giant water playground, wave simulator, fun-for-all roller coaster, suspened family coaster, thilling skyloop coaster, tree swing, train ride, dodgem cars, and a berry twirl ride for young children. There is also an exhibit featuring dingoes, lizards, crocodiles, koalas, aviaries and wallabies which incorporates a petting zoo.

History
Originally a pheasant farm, the facility was converted into a wildlife park in 1978 by the late Ron Rado.

In October 2011, vandals attached a powerful explosive charge to the large pheasant statue at the entrance to the park and blew out its rear end. That followed earlier vandalism, including the theft of mini cars and motor karts.

In September 2016, Gumbuya Park was sold for $4.65 million to a group of investors which included Gerry Ryan and Carsales founder Wal Pisciotta, Adam Campbell, Brett Murray, and Ray Weinzierl to buy the park and upgrade it into a more ambitious Theme Park.

Rides and attractions 

Outback Explorers

 Berry Twirl
 Outback Pirates ship
 Desert Derby dodgem cars
 Truck Convoy (leads to Gerry's Roadhouse)
 Ray's Express (takes visitors through Gumbuya World)
 Outback Pursuit

Wildlife Trail

 Koala and Dingo exhibit
 Walkthrough Aviary and Wallaby trail
 Critter Cave (featuring insects, lizards and baby crocodiles)
 Petting Zoo
The area contains 52 species of different animals in a bushland setting.

References

External links

Amusement parks in Victoria (Australia)
1978 establishments in Australia
Entertainment companies established in 1978